The Nakhoda Musjid is the principal mosque of Kolkata, India, in the Chitpur area of the Burrabazar business district in Central Kolkata, at the intersection of Zakaria Street and Rabindra Sarani.

Construction

The mosque was built as an imitation of the mausoleum of Mughal Emperor Akbar at Sikandra, Agra by Kutchi Memon Jamat, a small community of Sunni Muslim community from Kutch. 

The Nakhoda Musjid the largest Muslim Mosque in West Bengal and eastern India ha a long history. Before 1854 there used to be two different mosques at the present site. Haji Zakariah who was (Kutchi) Cutchi Memon merchant and business tycoon in those days was a regular musallee (devotee).  The Cutchi Memon are a Muslim community who came to Calcutta round 1823 onwards.  Haji Zakaria was the leader of other Sunni Muslim community who inhabited the surrounding areas of the present musjid. The mosque was named Nakhoda meaning Mariner.

Reconstruction work started in 1926 and was completed in 1935.  All the prominent Cutchi memons of Calcutta contributed for the new mosque but Abdul Rahim Osman was the biggest donor.  The total cost incurred for the construction was 1,500,000 Indian rupees in 1926. The contract for rebuilding the musjid was given to Mackintosh Burn & Co., a British engineering company.

Architecture and specifications

The mosque's prayer hall has a capacity of 10,000. 

The masjid has three domes and two minarets which are 151 feet high. There are an additional 25 smaller minarets which range from 100 feet to 117 feet high. 

The gateway is an ersatz of the Buland Darwaza at Fatehpur Sikri. For this purpose granite stones were brought from Tolepur. Inside is a superb exhibition of exquisite ornamentation and artistic extravaganza.

History

The Nakhoda Musjid the largest Muslim Mosque in West Bengal and eastern India ha a long history. Before 1854, there used to be two different mosques at the present site. Haji Zakariah who was (Kutchi) Cutchi Memon merchant and business tycoon in those days was a regular musallee (devotee).  The Cutchi Memon are a Muslim community who came to Calcutta round 1823 onwards.

Haji Zakaria was the leader of other Sunni Muslim community who in inhabitant the surrounding areas of the present musjid. The Cutchi Memons are a trading community and many of them had shipping business. Haji Zakariah who was the head of the community himself had 99 ships and was a landlord with several properties.  He was also known as the king of sugar business and this can he confirmed by the dad family who still stay at Central Avenue, Kolkata.

Haji Zakariah was a great philanthropist and religious person. He took over the management of the two mosques and also purchased the land between the two mosques.  He then built a huge mosque with his own money which became known as The Nakhoda Musjid.  Nakhoda in Persian means sailor and he was in shipping business.  He also established the Zakaria Madrassa and purchased four buildings for the benefit of Cutchi Memon.  Hajee Zakariah along with Hajee Wahidana his cousin, business partner and very close friend also purchased the Maniktalla Burial Ground at 248 A, B, and C, Achariya Parfulla Chandra Road, Kolkata.  There is a Bibi Jitan musjid and dargah also in the burial grounds.  It is a private burial ground for Cutchi Memon only but other communities are also allowed burials after taking permission from the trustees.  Maulana Khairuddin, his wife and family members are buried here. 

Hajee Zakariah also helped in building the Hafiz Jamal Masjid in Sundarya Patti (Rabindra Sarani) and also contributed in the construction of Naher-e-Zubeda in Madinah Sharif.  He was the sole trustee/ Mutawalli of the Zakaria Musjid also known as Nakhoda Musjid.  During this period many Arabs from Egypt, Iraq and Madinah used to come to India. Haji Zakaria appointed these Arab Imam at Nakhoda Musjid another prominent person who was very close to Haji Zakariah and Maulana Khairuddin (father of the first education minister of Indian), Maulana Abul Kalam Azad.  Maulana Khairuddin used to give Vaaiz / bayan at The Nakhoda Musjid and sometimes did the Emamt also.  Haji Zakariah died in 1865 and his son Haji Noor Mohammed Zakariah stepped into his shoe and continued to play the role of his father.  He contributed generously in building the Calcutta Muslim Orphanage.

Legal dispute
In 1906/7 AD, dispute arose among the Cutchi Memon Jamat and the matter was settled in the Calcutta High Court and a new set of rules were made to run the masjid. It was decided the Cutchi Memon Jamat members will choose the trustees and administrator and manage the musjid. It was also decreed by the High Court one member from the family of Haji Zakariah will always be trustee of the musjid and Jb. Ahmed Abdulla is representing the Zakariah family today. Meanwhile the Hajee Zakaria and company closed in 1923. During this period the Cutchi Memons had become very prosperous. One such person Jb. Abdul Rahim Osman who was a regular musallee of the musjid noticed a crack in the mehrab of the musjid. So he called a meeting of the Cutchi Memons and it was decided to rebuild The Nakhoda Musjid. The work started in 1926 and was completed in 1935. All the prominent Cutchi memons of Calcutta contributed for the new mosque but Abdul Rahim Osman was the biggest donor. Two houses of the jamat were sold and the money invested in the musjid later the trustees requested Haji Zakariah family to hand over the Zakariah Madrasa and also the personal house of Hajee Zakariah and Haji Wahidna to enlarge the mosque. The ground floor of the musjid has been maintained. All the marbles in the new musjid was used from the original Zakariah Musjid, Zakaria Madrassa and the dwelling house of Hajee Zakariah and Hajie Wahidna. The contract for building the musjid was given to Mackintosh Burn & Co., a British engineering company. The original Zakaria musjid and Zakariah Madrassa was also constructed by Mackintosh Burn & Co. the entire mujsid is built on the style of Jama Masjid Delhi and the gateway is based on Buland Darwaza of Fatehpur Sikri. During the construction, there was shortage of fund, so the two remaining buildings of the Jamat was mortgaged with Abdul Rahim Ossman for providing a loan. The two buildings were later sold and the money was returned to Abdul Rahim Osman & Co. the management of the musjid is looked after by a board of Trustees chosen by the Cutchi Memon Jamat. The management does not take any donation from the public or the government. The expenses are met from the rents of the musjid and the shortfall is met with contributions from Cutchi Memon of Calcutta. At present two imams, 3 moazzines, 5 durbans, 1 bill collector ,1 sweeper, 1 manager cum accountant and some temporary staff. The Maniktalla Buria grounds has 1 Imam, 1 Moazzine, 1 Security guard, two gorkhans (grave diggers) and 2 mujawar for the Dargah.

Both the Nakhoda Musjid and the Burial ground with musjid at maniktalla are registered with Board of wakfs and is the wakf properties of the Cutchi Memon Mohammadan Community. Zakaria Street and Haji Zakaria Lane in Maniktalla are named after Hajee Zakaria Who is the actual founder of The Nakhoda Musjid.

--- Narrated by Iqbal Abdulla (a descendant of Haji Zakaria)

Gallery

See also 
Current Jt. Trustees are Md. Zahid Ahmed, Ahmed Abdulla, Naseer Ebrahim & others.
Islamic architecture
Islamic art
Sahn
Timeline of Islamic history

References

External links 

Satellite picture by Google Maps
 Indira Gandhi National Centre for the Arts image of Nakhoda

Tourist attractions in Kolkata
Mosques completed in 1926
Mosques in Kolkata